Love Is the Law  may refer to:

Albums 
 Love Is the Law, a 1969 album by Graham Bond, or its title track
 Love Is the Law (Toyah album), or its title track, 1983
 Love Is the Law (Suburbs album), or its title track, 1984
 Love Is the Law (Mentallo & The Fixer album), or its title track, 2000
 Love Is the Law (Charlene Soraia album), or its title track, 2014

Songs 
 "Love Is the Law", a 1970 song by Sons of the Vegetal Mother
 "Love Is the Law", a 1985 song by Thompson Twins
 "Love Is the Law", a 1995 song by The Electric Hellfire Club
 "Love Is the Law" (The Seahorses song), 1997
 "Love Is the Law", a 2001 single by Paul Kelly
 "Love Is the Law", a 2009 song by Tata Young